The Doone Kennedy Hobart Aquatic Centre is a major, $17 million aquatic sporting facility located upon the Queens Domain, within less than 1 kilometre of the CBD of Hobart, the capital city of Tasmania, Australia. The venue has hosted the Australian Swimming Championships, the Tasmanian Swimming Championships, FINA Swimming World Cup, Pan Pacific Games and the Qantas Skins. Other major events held at the venue throughout its first seven years of operation include the Australian Canoe Polo Championships, Australian Diving Championships, Australian Water Polo Under Age and National League events and the World and Australian Underwater Hockey Championships.

Name
It was officially renamed on 18 October 2015, the 19th anniversary of its construction, in honour of Doone Kennedy, who was a key proponent for its development.

Construction
The funding and construction of the Hobart Aquatic Centre was spearheaded by Doone Kennedy during her reign as Lord Mayor of Hobart from 1986 to 1996.

The facility is fully indoors, and features a full 50 metre Olympic-size 8 lane competition swimming pool, a smaller 25 metre warm-up pool and leisure pool as well as a 25x20m Dive Pool. It also features a diving tower with 10, 7.5 and 5 metre platforms, and 1 and 3 metre springboards.

Operation
There is a creche, cafe and gymnasium and a wide variety of sport and recreation activities are offered, ranging from competitive swimming, Water Polo and diving, learn to swim programmes, yoga classes, aerobics and circuit and weight training. The Hobart Aquatic centre is open year round, and provides views of the River Derwent, Mount Wellington and the city.

See also

List of sports venues named after individuals

References

External links
 

Landmarks in Hobart
Sports venues in Hobart
Swimming venues in Australia
Buildings and structures in Hobart